Rozveh (also Romanized as Rozweh; also known as Rozba and Rūzīyeh) is a city in the Central District of Chadegan County, in western Isfahan Province, Iran.  At the 2006 census, its population was 4,916, in 1,153 families.

References

Populated places in Chadegan County

Cities in Isfahan Province